Institute of Software, Chinese Academy of Sciences (IOS, or ISCAS, simplified Chinese: 中国科学院软件研究所; pinyin: Zhōngguó Kēxuéyuàn Ruǎnjiàn Yánjiūsuǒ) is one of institutes that Chinese Academy of Sciences (CAS) established. It was established on March 1, 1985. It's  on the 4th Zhongguancun South Fourth Street, Haidian District, Beijing, China. There are branches in Wuxi, Chongqing, Harbin, Guangzhou, Qingdao and Guiyang. Its research areas are computer science theory and application, fundamental software technology and system structure, the Internet information processing theory, methods and technology, as well as the integrated information system technology. There are five departments in it, such as the General Division, Basic Research Division, Hi-Tech Research Division, Applied Research Division and Development Division. There are also state key laboratories and national engineering research centers. They are State Key Laboratory of Computer Science, National Engineering Research Center of Fundamental Software, Science and Technology on Integrated Information System Laboratory. Software academic journals hosted by ISCAS are Journal of Software, Journal of Chinese Information Processing and Computer Systems Applications.

See also
China Software Industry Association
Software industry in China

External links
 http://english.is.cas.cn/

Research institutes of the Chinese Academy of Sciences
Software industry
1985 establishments in China
Education in Beijing